Dichoxenus is a genus of broad-nosed weevils in the beetle family Curculionidae. There are at least four described species in Dichoxenus.

Species
These four species belong to the genus Dichoxenus:
 Dichoxenus occidentalis Sleeper, 1956 i c g
 Dichoxenus setiger Horn, 1876 i c g b
 Dichoxenus setosus (Blatchley, 1916) i c g
 Dichoxenus tessellatus Sleeper, 1956 i c g
Data sources: i = ITIS, c = Catalogue of Life, g = GBIF, b = Bugguide.net

References

Further reading

 
 
 
 

Entiminae
Articles created by Qbugbot